Vivienne Kelly is a former camogie player, winner of the AIB Gaelic Star award for Camogie Junior Player of the year in 1982. She played for Louth in their unsuccessful Junior National League final in 1981.

References

External links
 Camogie.ie Official Camogie Association Website
 Wikipedia List of Camogie players

Louth camogie players
Living people
Year of birth missing (living people)